Heikki Sakari Jurkka (originally Juurivirta; 16 September 1923 − 13 December 2012) was a Finnish theatre and film actor. He received a Jussi Award for best male performance in a 1954 film Minäkö isä!. He also directed three movies during his career. Sakari Jurkka's parents Eino and Emmi Jurkka, as well as his sister Vappu and brother Jussi Jurkka, were all actors.

Selected filmography

 Runon kuningas ja muuttolintu (1940)
 Gabriel, Come Back (1951)
 Noita palaa elämään (1952)
 Leena (1954) also director
 Helunan häämatka (1955) also director
 Silja – nuorena nukkunut (1956)
 Tweet, Tweet (1958)
 Voi veljet, mikä päivä! (1961) also director
 Täällä alkaa seikkailu (1965)
 Akseli and Elina (1970)
 Raid (2003)

References

External links 
 

1923 births
2012 deaths
Actors from Oulu
Finnish male film actors